Bayvel is a surname. Notable people with the surname include:

Paul Bayvel (1949–2020), South African rugby union player
Polina Bayvel (born 1966), British engineer and academic